Rekids is a UK-based independent record label, conceived in 2006 by Matt Edwards (aka Radio Slave) and James Masters.  The label releases mainly electronic dance music, incorporating elements of techno, house and disco.  The label has a number of core artists, among which includes Nina Kraviz.  Rekids has released a plethora of original work and remixes from various artists including Carl Craig, DJ Sneak, Kenny Larkin, Claude VonStroke, Josh Wink, Steve Lawler, Slam and Dubfire.

The Label
The label releases on a variety of formats, including vinyl, CD and digital.  All singles in the Rekids catalogue are released on vinyl as well as digitally.  Albums and compilations are available on both CD and digital.  Releases on Rekids sub-label REK'D are digital only, with the exception of the first release REK'D001 - Dustin Zahn - Stranger (To Stability) which was also released on vinyl.  REKIDS006CD, The Machine's (aka Matt Edwards) debut album 'RedHead' was also released on vinyl and is part of a wider collaborative project incorporating audio and visuals by Misha Hollenbach, one half of art and design duo Perks and Mini (P.A.M.).

REKIDS010CD, Nina Kraviz's debut album was also released as a double-vinyl with gatefold sleeve as well as on CD.

The label also takes special care with the artwork for each release, working mostly with Brighton-based 'Red Design'.  Over the years, the label has aimed to develop an identity through its artwork as well as the music it releases.

In 2011 Radio Slave collaborated with Japanese toy maker Devilrobots to create a Rekids-themed toy 'No Sleep No Tofu'.  The toy is a Japanese Kubrick figure produced by MediCom - a small, limited edition collector's item with a block-style human form similar to Playmobil or Lego.  The head of the figure is a detachable block which features the sleeve design for REKIDS036 - Radio Slave - No Sleep (Part Six).  After the earthquake and tsunami that hit Japan in early 2011, Rekids decided to donate all proceeds of the sales of the toy to support Red Cross relief efforts in Japan.  

2012 saw the launch of the 'Pyramids Of Mars' label - a multimedia project that involves the releases of books, films and other collector's items along with music. Matt's 2010 album 'RedHead' (under his 'Machine' pseudonym) was re-issued on Pyramids of Mars as part of a highly collectible deluxe package, including a re-interpretation of the full album by Joe Claussell. The boxset was limited to 50 copies, each hand-painted by Misha Hollenbach, and included triple-vinyl pressings of both Claussell's and Edwards' versions. The release was available exclusively at London's LN-CC store.  The first official musical release on Pyramids Of Mars was a collection of Quiet Village remixes.

Rekids also hosts regular club nights around Europe, most notably at Berlin's Panorama Bar and the Rex Club in Paris.

Discography

Albums

Compilations

 Various - ONE (REKIDS001CD, 2007)
 Various - Rekids Revolution (REKIDS004CD, 2009)
 Radio Slave - Works! Selected Remixes 2006 - 2010 (REKIDS009CD, 2011)

Singles

Rek'd

Pyramids of mars

Artists

 Radio Slave
 REKID
 Toby Tobias
 Mr. G
 Spencer Parker
 Luke Solomon
 Matt O'Brien
 Audiofly
 Paul Harris
 Discemi
 Kenny Hawkes
 David Parr
 Jjak Hogan
 Veinte Tres
 Danton Eeprom
 Runaway
 Santé
 Steffen Herb
 Deepgroove
 Jamie Anderson
 Worst Case Scenario
 Baeka
 Alexkid
 Chris Liebing
 Speedy J
 Nina Kraviz
 Nikola Gala
 James Teej
 Matt Tolfrey
 Christopher Sylvester
 Dustin Zahn
 Alex Tepper
 The Echologist
 Richard Seeley
 Aberrant
 The Machine
 Ronny & Renzo
 Butch
 Lee Van Dowski
 Liviu Groza
 Kennedy Smith
 The Rhythm Odyssey
 Nathan Barato
 DAP

Additional Remixers

 Roman Flugel
 Jesse Rose
 Prins Thomas
 Rob Mello
 Ripperton
 Claude VonStroke
 Quiet Village
 Partial Arts
 Marcel Dettmann
 Josh Wink
 Cosmo Vitelli
 Tiger Timing
 Brontosaurus
 Sebo K
 Andomat 3000
 I:Cube
 John Daly
 Dubfire
 Terrence Fixmer
 Slam
 Simon Baker
 Hippie Torales
 L.S.B
 Ajello
 Shed
 Adam Marshall
 Tedd Patterson
 Boola
 Christian Vogel
 Ben Klock
 Allez Allez
 Dave Ellesmere
 Tensnake
 Daniel Sanchez
 Michel Cleis
 Kaytronik
 Steve Lawler
 AFFKT
 Danny Fido
 Kenny Larkin
 DJ Sneak
 Melon
 Mendo
 Lewis Boardman
 Len Faki
 Reboot
 youANDme
 Rhauder
 Carl Craig
 Amine Edge
 Amir Alexander
 Molly
 D'Julz
 Ryan Elliott
 Matthew E
 DJ Qu
 Oliver $
 808 Fake
 Steve Rachmad
 KiNK

References

External links
 Rekids.com - Official Website
 Rekids at Discogs.com
 Rekids on SoundCloud

British independent record labels
Record labels based in London